General elections were held in Venezuela on Sunday 9 December 1973. The presidential elections were won by Carlos Andrés Pérez of Democratic Action, who received 48.7% of the vote, whilst his party won a majority of seats in the Chamber of Deputies and Senate. Voter turnout was 96.5%.

Results

President

Congress

References

1973 in Venezuela
Venezuela
Elections in Venezuela
Presidential elections in Venezuela
Election and referendum articles with incomplete results